Sverre Stallvik (11 October 1927–7 March 2015) was a Norwegian ski jumper who competed in the 1950s.

He was born in Trondheim and represented the club Byåsen IL. He placed ninth in the individual ski jump event at the 1956 Winter Olympics in Cortina d'Ampezzo. He became Norwegian Champion in 1955.

References

External links

1927 births
2015 deaths
Sportspeople from Trondheim
Ski jumpers at the 1956 Winter Olympics
Norwegian male ski jumpers
Olympic ski jumpers of Norway
20th-century Norwegian people